Fanny Bouvet (born February 15, 1994 in Versailles) is a French diver. She dives for Rennes CPB. She often competes in springboard diving from the 1-meter and 3-meter board, and with Marion Farissier trained in the 3-meter synchronized diving by Frederic Pierre.
Bouvet won her first international success at the Junior European Championships 2008 in Minsk, in her age group she won the title from the 3-meter board. She was denied the Youth Olympic Games 2010 in Singapore, where from the 3-meter board, they finished ninth. In the adult area, she took first place at the 2010 European Championships in Budapest in part, however, different from the one-meter board made after the preliminaries. First Finals 2011 reached Bouvet synchronized diving, with Farissier they finish at the World Championships in Shanghai and at the eleventh European Championship in Turin seventh. Bouvet qualified in each of the 3-meter springboard for the 2012 Olympics in London. She has a little brother named Mathieu.

References

1994 births
French female divers
Living people
Divers at the 2012 Summer Olympics
Olympic divers of France
Divers at the 2010 Summer Youth Olympics
21st-century French women